Huambo District may refer to:
 Huambo District, Rodríguez de Mendoza, a district of the province Rodríguez de Mendoza, in Amazonas, Peru
 Huambo District, Caylloma, a district of the province Caylloma in Arequipa, Peru

See also
 Huambo Province, Angola